Etox may refer to:

 Etox, a first Turkish automobile manufacturer
 eTOX, a toxicology focused research consortium
 ETOX, a German aquatic and terrestrial ecotoxicology database